The Changja River is a river of North Korea. The Changja River flows through the north of the county and flows through the city of Kanggye.

Rivers of North Korea